Rudolf Kleiner (21 June 1924 – 9 September 2012) was a Swiss speed skater. He competed in two events at the 1948 Winter Olympics.

References

External links
 

1924 births
2012 deaths
Swiss male speed skaters
Olympic speed skaters of Switzerland
Speed skaters at the 1948 Winter Olympics
Sportspeople from Basel-Stadt